Neopomacentrus anabatoides, commonly known as the silver demoiselle, is a fish native to the western Pacific Ocean.

References

External links
 

Fish of Thailand
Fish described in 1847
Fish of the Indian Ocean
anabatoides